Yuki Station may refer to any of the following railway stations in Japan:

 Yuki Station (Hiroshima) (油木駅)
 Yuki Station (Tokushima) (由岐駅)
 Yūki Station (結城駅)